Brand New Second Hand is the first studio album by English hip hop musician Roots Manuva. It was released on Big Dada in 1999.

Critical reception

Paul Cooper of Pitchfork gave the album a 9.5 out of 10, saying, "I find Roots Manuva's delivery addictive, compelling, and, above all, heartfelt." In 2014, Oscar Rickett of Vice said, "It's hard to believe it's been 15 years since this album was made. He added, "It's easier to believe that nothing as good as it has ever come out of the UK hip-hop scene."

NME named it the 37th best album of 1999.

Track listing

Credits

Co-Vocalists
IG Culture on "Dem Phonies"
Wildflower on "Baptism"
Seanie T. on "Big Tings Gwidarn"
Sober Now on "Sinking Sands
Thomas E on "Cornmeal Dumpling"

Miscellaneous
Turntables on "Soul Decay"
Jodi

Guitar on "Fever"
Richard Molyneaux

String instruments on "Motion 5000"
Isabelle Dunn, and Stella Page

Charts

Certifications

References

External links
 

Reggae albums by English artists
1999 debut albums
Roots Manuva albums
Big Dada albums